Joseph Lovitto, Jr. (January 6, 1951 – May 19, 2001) was an American professional baseball player, a center fielder in Major League Baseball who played for the Texas Rangers (1972–1975).

Career
A native of San Pedro, California, Lovitto was a competent outfielder with blazing speed who batted over .300 in his minor league career, but never fulfilled expectations at the Major League level. One of his former managers, Billy Martin, wrote, in his autobiography, that Lovitto could have had a great career if not for injuries.

In his rookie year he hit .224 (74-for-330) with 19 runs batted in and 13 stolen bases in 117 games played. Then he lost almost the 1973 season with an injured leg, appearing in only 26 games. The following year he hit .223 in 113 games, but in 1975 was put on the disabled list with a variety of major injuries and appeared in just 50 games. He was traded to the New York Mets for Gene Clines on December 12, 1975, but was released during spring training.

In a four-season career, Lovitto was a .216 hitter (165-for-763) with four home runs, 53 RBI, and 22 stolen bases in 306 games.

Death
Lovitto died from cancer in Arlington, Texas, at the age of 50.

References

External links

Baseball Almanac
Baseball Library

1951 births
2001 deaths
American people of Yugoslav descent
American people of Italian descent
Baseball players from California
Burlington Senators players
Deaths from cancer in Texas
Denver Bears players
Major League Baseball center fielders
Pittsfield Senators players
Shelby Senators players
Spokane Indians players
Texas Rangers players